Ghostbusters (later called Filmation's Ghostbusters) is a 1986 American animated television series created by Filmation and distributed by Tribune Entertainment, serving as the sequel to Filmation's 1975 live-action television show The Ghost Busters.

It is not to be confused with Columbia Pictures' 1984 film Ghostbusters or that film's subsequent animated television show The Real Ghostbusters, which premiered five days later. When making their film, Columbia Pictures needed to obtain rights to use the name from Filmation.

The success of Columbia's (unrelated) film spurred Filmation to resurrect their own property, producing an animated series based on the characters from the earlier TV show. This animated series ran from September 8 to December 5, 1986 in daytime syndication, and produced 65 episodes. The series is technically called simply Ghostbusters, but home video releases used the name Filmation's Ghostbusters to avoid confusion. In the U.S., reruns of the show previously aired on CBN Cable; The Family Channel, Qubo's Qubo Night Owl block from 2010 to 2013; and most recently on the Retro Television Network until 2015.

In the '80s, ABC aired the series in Australia.

Summary 
Jake Kong Jr. and Eddie Spencer Jr. are the sons of the original Ghost Busters from the live-action comedy series of the same name; Tracy the Gorilla had worked with their fathers.

Their headquarters, termed Ghost Command, is located in a haunted mansion nestled between a number of tall skyscrapers (which resemble the World Trade Center's Twin Towers in New York City). They are supported by a number of secondary characters including Ansabone, a talking skull phone; Skelevision, a talking skeleton television; Belfry, a pink talking bat; and Ghost Buggy Jr., their talking car. They occasionally enlist the aid of Futura, a time-traveling Ghostbuster from the future, and Jessica Wray, a local TV news reporter.

Together, they have dedicated themselves to ridding the world of the evil ghost wizard Prime Evil and his cast of henchmen. Prime Evil's headquarters, termed the Hauntquarters (which resembles the British Houses of Parliament complete with a Big Ben-esque clock tower), is located in The Fifth Dimension. In a typical episode, Prime Evil uses his magical powers to open up a wormhole to enable one or more of his henchmen to complete a particular scheme that serves to help him take over the world.

Famous guest-star ghosts and monsters that appeared on the show include Count Dracula (who is actually a vampire) and the Headless Horseman (who also appeared in an episode of The Real Ghostbusters written by Jean-Marc Lofficier's wife, Randy Lofficier).

Like almost all 1980s Filmation cartoons, each episode closes with a segment describing a particular lesson that can be learned from the events of the episode. Skelevision (sometimes accompanied by Belfry) is the character most often employed in this role. From time to time, Jake Jr., Eddie Jr. or another protagonist would talk with Skelevision about the lesson.

While The Real Ghostbusters had the catchphrase "Who you gonna call? Ghostbusters!", each episode of Filmation's Ghostbusters also used a catchphrase: "Let's go, Ghostbusters!"

Controversy 
When Columbia Pictures started producing the film Ghostbusters in 1984, it neglected the fact that Filmation had already produced a live-action comedy series with that same name in 1975. Columbia agreed to license the name from Filmation for $608,000, plus 1% of the profits (of which there were ostensibly none thanks to Hollywood accounting). This deal did not include giving Filmation the rights to make an animated series based on the film. After the film became a success, Filmation offered to make an animated series, but Columbia chose instead to give the contract to DiC. Filmation then decided to make their own animated show based on their 1975 live-action sitcom. It was released just a few days ahead of DiC's series.  DiC titled their own adaptation of the movie The Real Ghostbusters to directly distinguish it from the Filmation show.

The Filmation show and the DiC show aired simultaneously, and this left audiences confused because they had similar titles and concepts. This confusion led to poor toy sales for the Filmation show. In retrospect, producer Lou Scheimer felt that it had been an error to produce a Ghostbusters show in direct competition to the more popular Columbia show.

Toys 
Many toys were made by Schaper to go along with the series. The action figures were very good likenesses to their cartoon counterparts and included a small comic with each figure which was a shortened version of the first five episodes of the show. The series of figures included Jake, Eddie, Tracy, Belfry, Futura, Jessica, Brat-A-Rat, Prime Evil, Haunter, Scared Stiff, Mysteria, Fib Face and Fangster. Jake came with a removable backpack and Dematerializer. Eddie came with a removable backpack and Specter Snare. Tracy came with a removable backpack and Ghost Gummer. Due to their small size, Belfry and Brat-A-Rat were packaged together with a backpack that could be worn by Tracy or Fangster. Prime Evil had a removable cape. There were also several vehicles and play sets that included Ghost Buggy Jr., Futura's Time Hopper, Prime Evil's Bone Troller, the Scare Scooter and the Ghost Command play set. The following were not made into action figures, play sets, and roleplay accessories: Madam Why, Airhead, Flozart, Long John Scarechrome, Sir Trance-A-Lot and Frightmare, Apparatia, the Hauntquarters. The tagline for the series was "So much fun, it's spooky!"

Home media 
BCI Eclipse LLC (under its Ink & Paint classic animation entertainment label and under license from Entertainment Rights PLC) released the entire series in Region 1 in two-volume sets in 2007. Each episode on BCI Ink & Paint's DVD releases of the 1986 animated series of Filmation's Ghostbusters was uncut, re-mastered and in story continuity order. Each set also features extensive special features including interviews, commentary, image galleries, bonus episodes and more. Unlike many of BCI Ink & Paint's R1 DVD releases of the Filmation in-house library, with the exception of two episodes ("Tracy Come Back", and "Like Father, Like Son"), this DVD release appears to have been sourced from the original NTSC film prints. As of 2009, these releases have been discontinued and are out of print as BCI Eclipse ceased operations.

TGG Direct, LLC released a single-disc The Best of Ghostbusters DVD that contains four episodes ("Mummy Dearest", "Shades of Dracula", "The White Whale" and "Like Father, Like Son"). The disc was available at Wal-Mart on a cardboard backing.

Mill Creek Entertainment announced the re-release of the series on DVD.

In Australia, the complete series was released on DVD by Shock Entertainment across three 3-disc volumes on June 1, 2016.

The animated series was previously released on VHS by Celebrity Home Entertainment's "Just For Kids" imprint.

VHS UK history 
 Video Gems (later Little Gems) (September 1987 – 1993)

Recurring characters

Heroes 
 Jake Kong Jr. is the son of the original Jake Kong from The Ghost Busters. Jake is the leader of the Ghostbusters, just like his father was. He is often responsible for coming up with ideas to solve difficult problems. Action is what Jake lives for, and he takes ghostbusting very seriously. His nose twitches when ghosts are nearby. Jake is of Swedish heritage on his father's side of the family. Voiced by Pat Fraley.
 Eddie Spencer Jr. is the son of the original Eddie Spencer from The Ghost Busters. Eddie is often frightened by ghosts, though he always means well. He's klutzy, but what he lacks in wits and resourcefulness he compensates for in enthusiasm. Voiced by Peter Cullen.
 Tracy the Gorilla is the same ape from The Ghost Busters. Extremely smart, Tracy is credited with supplying the various ghost-busting gadgets which Jake and Eddie use; he'll often produce one on the fly, if needed. Tracy's as strong as he is clever, which also helps in the crunch. Unlike the live-action series, in which he usually wore a beanie, Tracy wears a fedora with a backpack and khaki shorts. Voiced by Lou Scheimer.
 Belfry is a pink-colored bat who can emit a sonic scream. Belfry calls it the Belfry Blast. Belfry will sometimes tag along on Ghostbusting adventures, but often is told it could be too dangerous. Belfry has three cousins: a Southern bat named Beauregard, a Brooklyn bat named Rafter, and an English bat named Yves. Belfry resembles Piglet from Winnie the Pooh. His name and species are a reference to the expression "bats in one's belfry". Voiced by Susan Blu.
 Futura is a ghostbusting sorceress from the 30th century who uses technology instead of magic. She's as intelligent and brave as she is lovely. Her vehicle of choice is the Time Hopper, a futuristic motorcycle. Futura is often called in by her 20th century predecessors whenever a bad situation gets worse. She can predict what is going to happen in the present time, as well as being telekinetic. She also seems to have a crush on Jake; often complimenting him on how he looks and periodically kissing him, much to his delight. In her original design, Futura was an African American with long, light-brown hair. Voiced by Susan Blu.
 Jessica Wray is a TV news reporter. She often reports on the events the Ghostbusters will go investigate and sometimes accompanies them. Jake seems to have a crush on her and she for him. She had blonde hair in her initial design. Voiced by Susan Blu.
 Madam Why is a fortune-telling Roma woman who speaks with a European accent, resides in a wagon, and occasionally assists the Ghostbusters. Voiced by Linda Gary.
 Ghost Buggy Jr., a.k.a. G.B. is the Ghostbusters' Southern accent-talking car that can assume many forms of transportation (including a train complete with graffiti on the sides), along with the ability to travel through time. Ghost Buggy resembles the Chitty Chitty Bang Bang car. Ghost Buggy Jr. is often found sleeping in Ghost Command's garage and gets annoyed when the Ghostbusters land on him. His face is the ghost shown in the series logo. Voiced by Pat Fraley.
 Corky is Jessica's young nephew. He wears an orange shirt with the Ghostbusters logo on it. Voiced by Erika Scheimer.
 Ansabone is Ghost Command's talking skull telephone. When the Ghostbusters get a call for help, Ansabone will usually make it hard for them to answer him and will give the caller a sarcastic message (example: "You've reached the Ghostbusters and you're in luck. They're not here!" or "The Ghostbusters are out right now. Outta their minds, that is!"). Voiced by Lou Scheimer.
 Skelevision is Ghost Command's talking skeleton television. Skelevision often shows the Ghostbusters the problem they will have to face and is very often the one who talks about the lesson that can be learned from the episode. Voiced by Lou Scheimer.
 Skelevator is Ghost Command's bony elevator with a mind of its own. It is the primary transport for the Ghostbusters to change into their ghost-busting attire. A portable version is used when the Ghostbusters are on location while tracking ghosts. Voiced by Erika Scheimer.
 Shock Clock is Ghost Command's talking cuckoo clock. Voiced by Erika Scheimer.
 Merlin is the famed wizard of King Arthur's era, who has previously crossed paths with Prime Evil. Voiced by Alan Oppenheimer (the actor would later go on to voice Merlin again in The Legend of Prince Valiant).
 Fuddy is Merlin's apprentice. When a full moon is out, Jake is able to chant and call him for help by casting a magic spell, which rarely works the way it is intended. He is similar to Orko from He-Man and the Masters of the Universe, though he sounds like Kowl from She-Ra: Princess of Power. Voiced by Lou Scheimer.
 Jake Kong Sr. and Eddie Spenser Sr. are Jake and Eddie's fathers, the original Ghostbusters, who occasionally appear in animated form as well. They are voiced by the same actors that do the voices of Jake (voiced by Pat Fraley) and Eddie (voiced by Peter Cullen), respectively.
 Skelescope is Ghost Command's talking telescope. Voiced by Pat Fraley.
 Ghost Buggy Sr. is the car of the original Ghostbusters and GB's father.
 Time Hopper is Futura's hover scooter. GB has a crush on her, but she does not feel the same way. Voiced by Susan Blu.
 Foxfire is a super-fast-running male fox who resides with Madam Why.

Villains 
 Prime Evil: The primary villain is a wizard, although he appears to be a robot with an android-like human skull and garbed in flowing red robes. His name is a pun of the word "primeval". Prime Evil has many evil powers, including the ability to shoot energy bolts from his fingers. Prime Evil's minions often find themselves getting zapped when they do not succeed in stopping the Ghostbusters. He encounters the Ghostbusters in the first episode; however, they outsmarted him and imprisoned him for 100 years, until he escaped. He went back in time to get his revenge. Prime Evil has a hard time saying "Ghostbusters" and will often refer to them as "Ghost Blisters", "Ghost Buzzards", "Ghost Brats", "Ghost Bozos", "Ghost Busting Goons", "Ghost Bunglers", etc. He was originally designed to resemble Mumm-Ra from ThunderCats. Voiced by Alan Oppenheimer.

Prime Evil's ghosts

Main 
 Brat-A-Rat: This pot-bellied, legless flying rat has an elongated nose and a lizard-like body, with an acute squint in one eye. He has no wings, but levitates. He serves as Prime Evil's right-hand and tattletale. His name is loosely based on Burt Bacharach. An accomplished keyboard-player, Brat-A-Rat is disliked by Prime Evil's followers as much as Belfry is loved by the Ghostbusters. Voiced by Peter Cullen.
 Scared Stiff: A robotic skeleton, similar in appearance to C-3PO. He is easily frightened and is often zapped to pieces by Prime Evil or falls apart on account of his own fear. He was originally stockier in his pilot appearance. Voiced by Pat Fraley.
 Fangster: A werewolf from the future who wears high-top gym shoes. Voiced by Alan Oppenheimer in a style similar to Cringer from He-Man and the Masters of the Universe.
 The Haunter: "Civilized Hunter of Haunted Prey". He resembles a safari hunter with an English accent. His vocal nuance exaggerates the letter "r" for the letter "w", such as pronouncing "Dematerializer" as "Dematewealwizer." He often gets in trouble for calling Prime Evil "old boy", "old bean" and other English endearments. According to the DVD guidebook, the Haunter's speech, mannerisms, and appearance are based on actor Terry-Thomas. He will sometimes make his pith helmet extremely large to fly in or to assist in kidnapping people. His magic monocle has the power to turn people mean. He is possibly Prime Evil's most loyal minion, as he never sided with Big Evil, believing such a thing was bad business. Voiced by Peter Cullen.
 Mysteria: "Mistress of Mists". She resembles Morticia from The Addams Family, wearing a long black hairstyle. She has power over mist and is known for calling people "darling". She is also known for her extreme vanity. She originally had a human appearance and a long red dress. Voiced by Linda Gary in a style similar to Evil-Lyn from He-Man and the Masters of the Universe.
 Sir Trance-A-Lot: "A Bad Knight to One and All". A skeleton knight with a Dalí-esque moustache who also rides a skeletal horse named Frightmare, and wields the Trance Lance that fires beams that induce sleep. His name is a reference to Sir Lancelot. Voiced by Lou Scheimer.
 Apparitia: "Spirit Sorceress Supreme". A vampish sorceress who talks like Mae West. Like her name implies, she can conjure up all sorts of apparitions. She wears a sleeveless red dress with long green hair, thus giving her a similar look to Eris, the Greek goddess of discord. Voiced by Linda Gary.
 Captain Long John Scarechrome: A pirate ghost bearing a hook and metal peg leg and with an Australian-sounding pirate-type accent. His name is a reference to Long John Silver. Voiced by Alan Oppenheimer.

Secondary 
 Airhead: An overweight mummy ghost who is nothing but bandages. Airhead lives up to his name, as he is not very smart. He often makes really bad jokes which amuse only himself ("Duh, Airhead make joke!"). Voiced by Alan Oppenheimer.
 Floatzart: "Musical Maestro of Fright". A petite, red-haired tuxedo-wearing ghost with music-themed powers; loosely based on Wolfgang Amadeus Mozart, but looks like Ludwig van Beethoven. Voiced by Peter Cullen.
 Fib Face: A two-faced villain who is incapable of telling the truth. Like Prime Evil, he is immune to Jake's Dematerialization gun; the only way to send him to limbo is to make his faces argue with each other. Voiced by Lou Scheimer.
 Dr. Creep: A skeletal scientist who betrays Prime Evil for Big Evil.

Other 
 The Tooth Scaries: Three small ghosts named Big Tooth, Sweet Tooth, and Cavity. A fourth one, a girl named Flossy, appeared later. Her guitar has the power to put anyone to sleep. They have the power to eat anything, due to their sharp teeth. They eventually become good.
 Big Evil: Prime Evil's overweight rival, with four arms and pointed ears. He is so powerful that he forced Prime Evil to team up with the Ghostbusters to defeat him, much to Prime Evil's dismay. Voiced by Peter Cullen.
 Corpulon: A ghost from the future with a grudge against Futura, who sent him to limbo. He requires massive amounts of energy to stay "alive"—in fact, he eats it out of enormous jars. He uses "Bug-Droids" to do his dirty work. Remarkably, Corpulon is one of the few ghosts in the series who is not associated with Prime Evil. Voiced by Peter Cullen.

Weapons 
Note: only the Dematerializer was carried over from the live-action series. All other weapons shown here are specific to this series.
 The Dematerializer: The Ghostbusters' main weapon, it shoots a beam that banishes ghosts to limbo, but does not always work (Prime Evil, for example, is too powerful to be affected, and while it works on Fangster, a werewolf, and Scared Stiff, a robot, it does not work on vampires (like Count Dracula) or on a "voodoo monster" named Voodon (seen in "The Bind That Ties")). It tends to get broken, preventing the Ghostbusters from achieving easy victory.
 The Ghost Gummer: Shoots a gob of a sticky pink substance to immobilize enemies.
 The Spectre Snare: Shoots a coiled rope to trap a ghost.
 The Bubble Blaster: Fires off a stream of soaplike bubbles that combine to form one large bubble to entrap a ghost.
 The Dematerializer Net: An energized net that is stretched across the Ghost Buggy that causes ghosts to be banished to limbo as soon as they touch it.
 The Ghost Packs: The standard equipment packs Jake and Eddie carry with their Ghostbusters logo on it. They hold a number of devices within them and also act as jet packs when needed. Tracy carries a larger version, which includes the portable Transformation Chamber itself. The Ghost Packs replace the single "satchel" from the live-action series.
 The Transformation Chamber: A skeletal elevator normally located at Ghostbusters HQ, which Jake and Eddie use to change into their uniforms and equip themselves with their Ghost Packs. After a cry of "Let's go, Ghostbusters!", the elevator rises up into some kind of ghostly dimension where they are stripped down to their underwear and prepared for battle. Their 'transformation sequence' is a series of acrobatic movements along a kind of assembly line, with trapezes, a slide, and bouncing off an old mattress to land into Ghost Buggy Jr. In the majority of the episodes, viewers see part or all of this process.
 The Ghost Post: A weapon owned by the original Ghostbusters. Its functions are unknown, as it was just about to be used.
 The Fright Freezer: A weapon mounted to the side of Ghost Buggy Jr. that can freeze ghosts instantly.
 The Micro Dematerializer: All the abilities of the regular-sized Dematerializer packed into a flashlight-sized "phaser"-type weapon.
 The Ecto-Strobe: A device that, when flashed intermittently, could detect recent ghost and supernatural activity. It could also be used to temporarily stun or blind ghosts. This often made cases a bit too easy.
 The Ghost Gobbler: A handheld portable 'phaser'-like weapon that would fire a containment field or force field and trap a ghost inside the energy beam; with a rotation of the device the ghost could be shrunk down to a much smaller size and effectively captured or dealt with. Jake describes it is an 'Ecto-Plasmic holographic laser perimeter', while Eddie called it the Ghost Gobbler. Debuted in the episode "Going Ape" alongside the Ecto-Strobe.

Episodes

Production notes 
Ghostbusters was no exception of Filmation's budget-trimming methods, using among others, an extensive sequence where they got their equipment and the Ghost Buggy. In the episode "The Girl Who Cried Vampire", Filmation reused the model sheets and character designs of Drac and Bella La Ghostly from the Groovie Goolies as Victor and Vampra. Drac's clumsy bat transformation sequence, banging against the floor and ceiling, changing clumsily from vampire to bat was reused in this episode and in several others. In the episode "The Way You Are", Super Spencer makes a reference to He-Man from He-Man and the Masters of the Universe when he punches the door.

Comic book 

First Comics published a comic-book miniseries in 1987 based on the show. Originally intended as a six-issue series, only four issues were published. The unpublished issues (along with reprints of the First Comics series) were published in a six-issue set in Germany by Bastei Verlag in 1988. In the UK, numerous issues were reprinted in a hardcover annual called Filmation's Ghostbusters Annual 1987 by World Color Press.

References

External links 
 
 Filmation's Ghostbusters at Don Markstein's Toonopedia. Archived from the original on July 25, 2016
 Filmation's Ghostbusters Toyline at ToyArchive.com

1980s American animated television series
1986 American television series debuts
1986 American television series endings
American children's animated adventure television series
American children's animated comic science fiction television series
American children's animated science fantasy television series
American children's animated horror television series
American sequel television series
Animated television series about ghosts
Animated television series about robots
Fictional quartets
First-run syndicated television programs in the United States
Ghostbusters television series
Television series by Filmation